Together Forever is a 2012 Philippine romance comedy-drama television series broadcast by GMA Network. The series is a spin-off from Red Mask, a Philippine short film aired on Party Pilipinas. Directed by Roderick Lindayag, it stars Julie Anne San Jose and Elmo Magalona. It premiered on June 17, 2012 on the network's Sunday afternoon line up replacing Reel Love Presents Tween Hearts. The series concluded on September 8, 2012 with a total of 13 episodes. It was replaced by Kapuso Sine Siesta in its timeslot.

Cast and characters

Lead cast
 Elmo Magalona as Ely Trinidad
 Julie Anne San Jose as Antoinette "Toyang" Escueta

Supporting cast
 Janine Gutierrez as Jasmine "Jas" Trinidad
 Renz Valerio as Rasputin "Raz" Trinidad
 Lexi Fernandez as Shirley Custoya
 Enzo Pineda as Angelo delos Santos
 Steven Silva as Cholo Limuanco
 Benedict Campos as Ben Dizon
 Sef Cadayona as Jefferson "Jepoy" Teodoro
 Patricia Ysmael as Gay
 Jackie Lou Blanco as Evelyn Trinidad

Guest cast
Aljur Abrenica as Santiago "Yago" Carion
Sam Pinto as Samantha "Sam"
 Matthew Mendoza as Mark Trinidad
 Lovely Rivero as Andrea Trinidad
 Maricel Morales as Angelo's mother

Ratings
According to AGB Nielsen Philippines' Mega Manila household television ratings, the pilot episode of Together Forever earned a 10.8% rating. While the final episode scored a 7.5% rating.

Accolades

References

External links
 

2012 Philippine television series debuts
2012 Philippine television series endings
Filipino-language television shows
GMA Network drama series
Philippine romantic comedy television series
Philippine teen drama television series
Television series about teenagers
Television shows set in Manila